The Game of the Goose or goose game is a board game where two or more players move pieces around a track by rolling one or two dice. The aim of the game is to reach square number 63 before any of the other players, while avoiding obstacles such as the Inn, the Bridge, and Death.

It is considered the prototype of many of the commercial European racing board games of later centuries. It attained great popularity in the 16th century. The game is mostly played in Europe and seen as family entertainment. Commercial versions of the game appeared in the 1880s and 1890s, and feature typical old European characteristics such as an old well and children in clothes from the period.

History
The game's origins are uncertain. According to Adrien Seville, the earliest recorded mention to the game was in a book of sermons by the Dominican friar Gabriele da Barletta published in 1480. Some connect the game with the Phaistos Disc because of its spiral shape but, as Caroline Goodfellow notes, the two games "are unlikely to have been the same". A version of the game was given as a gift by Grand Duke Francesco I de' Medici of Tuscany to King Philip II of Spain sometime between 1574 and 1587. In June 1597 John Wolfe enters the game in the Stationers' Register, as "the newe and most pleasant game of the goose". Another theory links the game to the Pilgrims' Way to Santiago, or the Road to Saint James of Compostela, in Galicia. According to this hypothesis, the game was invented by the Knights Templar, who were in charge of protecting those on pilgrimage to the main holy cities: Compostela, Rome and Jerusalem. 

In the 1960s, the game company CO-5 marketed a variant called Gooses Wild.

Description
The board consists of a track with consecutively numbered spaces (usually 63), and is often arranged in a spiral with the starting point at the outside. Each player's piece is moved according to throws of one or two dice. Scattered throughout the board are a number of spaces on which a goose is depicted; landing on a goose allows the player to move again by the same distance.  Additional shortcuts, such as spaces marked with a bridge, move the player to some other specified position.  There are also a few penalty spaces which force the player to move backwards or lose one or more turns, the most recognizable being the one marked with a skull and symbolizing death; landing on this space results in the player being sent back to start. On Spanish boards the reverse is usually a parchís board.

Many themed versions of the game have been created, depicting topics as diverse as ice skating, Richard Nixon, and sewage pumps. These can be valued for their historical or artistic merits even by those who have no interest in the game itself, with some editions having been sold for thousands of dollars at auction or displayed in museums.

In worldwide culture

 In Jacques Offenbach's comic opera La Belle Hélène, the Greek Kings sing about and play a Game of the Goose and argue over cheating.
 In his 1899 novel Le Testament d’un excentrique, Jules Verne uses the United States as a giant real-life Game of the Goose board, on which seven players race each other in pursuit of a $60,000,000 inheritance.
 In Roger Martin du Gard's novel The Thibaults, Monsieur Chasle, the proprietor of a store that markets various inventions, mentions that one of his designers has created a portable jeu de l'Oie des Alliés imprinted with scenes from the Battle of the Marne, Douaumont, and other battles of World War I.
 In Ursula Dubosarsky's novel for children, The Game of the Goose (Penguin Australia 2000), three children find an old copy of the Game of the Goose in a Salvation Army store, and have magically transforming adventures while playing it.
 The game was the basis for a game and stunt show in Italy named Il Grande Gioco Dell'Oca (The Great Game of the Goose), as well as the near-identical Spanish version, El gran juego de la oca (same).  The Spanish version ran from 1993 to 1995, and again in 1998 as El nuevo juego de la oca (The New Game of the Goose).
 In Jacques Rivette's film, Le Pont du Nord, the game is described by the main character, Marie Lafée. The game itself provides the plot structure.

References

External links

 Dagonell's rules of the Game of the Goose
 Printable Board for the Game of the Goose
 A history of the Game of the Goose

 "Giochi dell'oca e di percorso" by L.Ciompi&A.Seville
 "A probabilistic analysis of the Game of the Goose" by J.F. Groote, F. Wiedijk and H. Zantema, SIAM Reviews 58(1):143-155, 2016

History of board games
Roll-and-move board games
Race games
Traditional board games
Entertainment in Europe
Cultural history of Europe